The Restaurant School at Walnut Hill College (aka just Walnut Hill College) is a private, for-profit, family-run, culinary school in Philadelphia, Pennsylvania.

History
The school was founded in 1974 as America's first private college to offer career training in fine dining and the luxury hospitality industry.

Academics
The college offers four majors: Culinary Arts; Restaurant Management; Pastry Arts; and Hotel Management. The majors are offered at the Associate's and Bachelor's degree levels.

Special features are travel experiences which are included in the tuition. All Culinary and Pastry students in the associate degree participate in a week-long gastronomic tour of France. Restaurant and Hotel Management students participate in a week-long hospitality tour that includes behind-the-scenes tours of Walt Disney World Resort and other central Florida resorts followed by a cruise to the Bahamas. Students who continue their studies towards a bachelor's degree participate in a week-long "Hospitality Tour" of England.

The school is accredited by the Accrediting Commission of Career Schools and Colleges, which is oriented toward vocational programs.

Geography
The campus is located in the University City section of Philadelphia. It features four open-to-the-public student-run restaurants, a pastry shop, a bookstore and gift shop, and a student cafe. The college offers on-site housing for students.

References

External links

Universities and colleges in Philadelphia
Educational institutions established in 1974
1974 establishments in Pennsylvania
University City, Philadelphia
Cooking schools in the United States